WSSM (104.9 FM) is a radio station broadcasting a classic country format licensed to Prentiss, Mississippi, United States. The station is currently owned by Sunbelt Broadcasting Corporation.

On July 1, 2017, the then-WCJU-FM changed their format from oldies to talk/classic hits.

References

External links

SSM (FM)
Radio stations established in 2002
2002 establishments in Mississippi
Classic country radio stations in the United States